The 381st Bombardment Squadron is an inactive United States Air Force unit. It was last assigned to the 310th Bombardment Wing at Schilling Air Force Base, Kansas, where it was inactivated on 25 March 1965.

History

World War II

Activated in mid-1942 as a North American B-25 Mitchell medium bomber squadron, it was trained by the Third Air Force in the southeastern United States. The squadron deployed initially to England in September 1942 and flew some missions under the VIII Bomber Command over German-occupied France, attacking enemy troop formations, bridges and airfields. It was part of Operation Torch, the invasion of North Africa in November 1942, being deployed to the new Mediterranean Theater of Operations, and was assigned to the Twelfth Air Force in French Morocco in November. In North Africa, the squadron engaged primarily in support and interdictory operations, bombing marshalling yards, rail lines, highways, bridges, viaducts, troop concentrations, gun emplacements, shipping, harbors and other targets in North Africa.

The squadron also engaged in psychological warfare missions, dropping propaganda leaflets behind enemy lines. It took part in the Allied operations against Axis forces in North Africa during March–May 1943 and the reduction of Pantelleria and Lampedusain islands during June. Squadron personnel were also involved in the invasion of Sicily in July, the landing at Salerno on the Italian mainland in September, the Allied advance toward Rome during January–June 1944, the invasion of southern France in August 1944 and the Allied operations in northern Italy from September 1944 to April 1945.

It was inactivated in Italy after the German capitulation in September 1945.

Reserve operations

The squadron was reactivated as part of the reserve in 1947, it is unclear whether or not the squadron was manned or equipped. It was inactivated later that year.

Strategic Air Command
It was reactivated on 28 March 1952 as a Strategic Air Command (SAC) squadron, although it did not become operational until 4 April.   receiving Boeing B-29 Superfortress bombardment training from the 90th Bombardment Wing between April and August 1952.  The squadron acted as a training unit until 1954 when it replaced the propeller-driven B-29s with new Boeing B-47E Stratojet swept-wing medium bombers. These aircraft were capable of flying at high subsonic speeds and were primarily designed for penetrating the airspace of the Soviet Union. By the early 1960s, the B-47s were considered to be reaching obsolescence, and were being phased out of SAC's strategic arsenal. They were sent to the Aerospace Maintenance and Regeneration Center at Davis-Monthan Air Force Base, Arizona in early 1965; the unit became non operational on 25 February, and was inactivated on 25 March.

Lineage
 Constituted as the 381st Bombardment Squadron (Medium) on 28 January 1942
 Activated on 15 March 1942
 Redesignated 381st Bombardment Squadron, Medium c. 30 August 1943
 Inactivated on 12 September 1945
 Redesignated 381st Bombardment Squadron, Light on 11 March 1947
 Activated in the reserve on 9 August 1947
 Inactivated on 27 Jun 1949
 Redesignated 381st Bombardment Squadron, Medium on 15 March 1952
 Activated on 28 March 1952
 Inactivated on 25 March 1965

Assignments
 310th Bombardment Group, 15 March 1942 –12 September 1945
 310th Bombardment Group, 9 August 1947 – 27 June 1949
 310th Bombardment Wing (later 310th Strategic Aerospace Wing), 28 March 1952 – 25 March 1965

Stations

 Davis-Monthan Field, Arizona, 15 March 1942
 Jackson Army Air Base, Mississippi, 15 March 1942
 Key Field, Mississippi, 25 April 1942
 Columbia Army Air Base, South Carolina, 18 May 1942
 Walterboro Army Air Field, South Carolina, 14 August 1942
 Greenville Army Air Base, South Carolina, 18 September – 17 October 1942
 RAF Hardwick, England, September–November 1942 (air echelon)
 Mediouna Airfield, French Morocco, 18 November 1942
 Telergma Airfield, Algeria, 21 December 1942
 Berteaux Airfield, Algeria, 1 January 1943

 Dar el Koudia Airfield, Tunisia, c. 6 June 1943
 Menzel Temime Airfield, Tunisia, 5 August 1943 (operated from Oudna Airfield, Tunisa after 11 October 1943)
 Philippeville Airfield, Algeria, 18 November 1943
 Ghisonaccia Airfield, Corsica, France, 21 January 1944
 Fano Airfield, Italy, 7 April 1945
 Pomigliano Airfield, Italy, c. 15 August – 12 September 1945
 Bedford Army Air Field, Massachusetts, 9 August 1947 – 27 June 1949
 Forbes Air Force Base, Kansas, 28 March 1952
 Smoky Hill Air Force Base (later Schilling Air Force Base), Kansas, 3 September 1952 – 25 March 1965

Aircraft
 North American B-25 Mitchell, 1942-1945
 Boeing B-29 Superfortress, 1952-1954
 Boeing B-47 Stratojet, 1954-1965

References

Notes
 Explanatory notes

 Citations

Bibliography

 
 
 
 

Bombardment squadrons of the United States Air Force
Military units and formations in Kansas
Bombardment squadrons of the United States Army Air Forces
Military units and formations established in 1942